= Florence Institute of Design International =

Design school in Florence, Italy

The Florence Institute of Design International in an international school of Italian design. The institute was founded in 2008 in Florence Italy. Admission to the school is open to students from any country. All classes are held in the English language. Programs that are currently offered include Interior Design, Graphic Design, Art History, and Architecture.
